Graciella compacta is a species of beetle in the family Cerambycidae. It was described by Karl Jordan in 1894.

Subspecies
 Graciella compacta compacta Jordan, 1894
 Graciella compacta marmorata (Fairmaire, 1897)
 Graciella compacta zanzibarica Jordan, 1894

References

Tragocephalini
Beetles described in 1894